Carter Country is an American sitcom that aired on ABC from September 15, 1977 to August 23, 1979.  It starred Victor French and Kene Holliday.  A young Melanie Griffith appeared in two episodes.

Synopsis
Carter Country is set in the fictional small town of Clinton Corners in Georgia (presumably near the part of the state from which U.S. President Jimmy Carter hailed, thus the title) and features French as police chief Roy Mobey and Holliday as city-bred, college-educated, Sergeant Curtis Baker.

Richard Paul as Mayor Teddy Burnside, Harvey Vernon as racist officer Jasper DeWitt, and Barbara Cason as town employee Cloris Phebus rounded out the cast. DeWitt was shown to be a member of the local branch of the Ku Klux Klan and he often made disparaging comments against minorities, but was still a loyal and honest law enforcement officer. In several episodes it is hinted that his racist attitude is an act and that he joined the KKK in order to keep an eye on their activities. Separate from his racism, DeWitt resents Baker for taking the sergeant's position, to which DeWitt felt entitled due to his tenure. Additional comic support was provided by Texas-born actor Guich Koock who played the part of goofy deputy Harley. Vernee Watson rounded out the cast as the mayor's educated secretary and a love interest for Baker.  The plot centered around the stereotypical racism of the Deep South, and was often characterized as being an irreverent, comedic version of the movie In the Heat of the Night, especially with the aspect of an educated, African American man coming to a small, southern town to work as a police officer.

The character of Mayor Burnside coined a minor catchphrase with his manic "Handle it, Roy, handle it!", used when delegating various details to Chief Mobey such as fixing a parking ticket. If Mobey protested or asked any further questions, Burnside would stifle further discussion with a dismissive hand gesture and a further "Handle it, handle it, handle it!"

Burnside often introduced himself to members of the public as "Teddy Burnside, your mayor by a landslide."

Ratings
The first season ranked 32nd out of 104 shows, and averaged a 19.6 rating. The second season ranked 70th out of 114 shows, with an average 15.6/27 rating/share.

Popular culture
Mayor Burnside's catchphrase "Handle it, Roy, handle it!" was repeated by rapper Greg Nice for the 1992 Gang Starr/Nice & Smooth hip hop song DWYCK.

Episodes

Season 1: 1977–78

Season 2: 1978–79

References

External links
 

1977 American television series debuts
1979 American television series endings
Television series by Sony Pictures Television
Television shows set in Georgia (U.S. state)
American Broadcasting Company original programming
1970s American sitcoms
1970s American workplace comedy television series
English-language television shows